Saint Martyrs of Jasenovac (Various dates - 1941) are orthodox Christians saints and martyrs who were murdered by Croatian fascist Ustaše in a genocide campaign against Serbs in Jasenovac Concentration Camp at the time in Independent State of Croatia. In the calendar of the saints the martyrdom entered and which she celebrates at 31 August in Orthodox Church.

The memorial of the New Martyrs of Jasenovac appeared in the calendars in the 1980, during the Serbian Orthodox Diocese in USA and Canada.

In the calendars printed by the then Diocese of America and Canada from New Gracanica near Chicago, the holiday of the Jasenovac Martyrs was also published.

Later, after the healing of that great church wound, grace by Patriarch Pavle, Metropolitan Irinej and other archbishops, the Holy Synod of Bishops of the Serbian Orthodox Church decides that their memory can be entered and celebrated in calendars printed by Serbian bishops abroad.

Since 2010, the holiday of the Holy New Martyrs of Jasenovac has been binding on the entire Serbian Orthodox Church.

On April 16, 2010, the Holy Synod of Bishops of the Serbian Orthodox Church decided to celebrate the memory of the Holy New Martyrs of Jasenovac on August 31 according to Julian Calendar, and September 13 according to Gregorian Calendar.

The main celebration of the Holy Serbian New Martyrs of Jasenovac is liturgically celebrated in the Jasenovac Monastery.

References 

20th-century Eastern Orthodox martyrs
Genocide of Serbs in the Independent State of Croatia
Serbs of Croatia
1941 in Croatia
Martyred groups
World War II crimes in Yugoslavia
Anti-Serbian sentiment
Anti-Eastern Orthodoxy in Catholicism
Axis war crimes in Yugoslavia
History of the Serbs of Croatia
Catholicisation
Croatia in World War II
Eastern Orthodox–Catholic conflicts
Persecution of Eastern Orthodox Christians
Persecution of Serbs
Serbia in World War II
The Holocaust in Yugoslavia
Ustaše
War crimes of the Independent State of Croatia
Year of birth unknown